Kim Dong-jun (Hangul: 김동준, Hanja: 金東俊, born 19 December 1994) is a South Korean footballer who plays as a goalkeeper for Jeju United and South Korea national team.

Career statistics

Club
As of 4 March 2023.

International career
Kim was called up to the senior South Korea team by Uli Stielike for 2018 FIFA World Cup qualifiers against Laos and Lebanon in September 2015.

Honours

International
South Korea U23
 King's Cup: 2015

South Korea
 EAFF Championship : 2017

Individual
 EAFF Championship Best Goalkeeper: 2022

References

External links

1994 births
People from Suncheon
South Korean footballers
South Korea under-20 international footballers
South Korea under-23 international footballers
South Korea international footballers
Seongnam FC players
Daejeon Hana Citizen FC players
Jeju United FC players
K League 1 players
K League 2 players
Association football goalkeepers
Living people
Footballers at the 2016 Summer Olympics
Olympic footballers of South Korea
Sportspeople from South Jeolla Province